Alvin Tehau (born April 10, 1989) is a Tahitian professional association footballer who plays for A.S. Tefana as a central midfielder. He is the twin brother of Lorenzo Tehau, brother of Jonathan Tehau and cousin of Teaonui Tehau, all playing for Tahiti national football team.

Tehau is a full-time member of the Tahiti national football team, and represented his country at the 2013 FIFA Confederations Cup.

He signed for Aceh United of Liga Primer Indonesia in 2011, alongside Cameroon international footballers Pierre Njanka and Alain N'Kong.

International goals
As of match played 1 June 2016. Tahiti score listed first, score column indicates score after each Tehau goal.

Honours

Domestic
Tahiti First Division:
 Winner (2): 2010, 2011

Tahiti Cup:
 Winner (2): 2010, 2011

International
OFC Champions League:
 Runner-up (1): 2012

OFC Nations Cup:
 Winner (1): 2012

International career statistics

References

External links

1989 births
Living people
French Polynesian footballers
French Polynesian expatriate footballers
Tahiti international footballers
Aceh United F.C. players
Indonesian Premier Division players
Expatriate footballers in Belgium
Expatriate footballers in Indonesia
Tahitian expatriate sportspeople in Belgium
Tahitian expatriate sportspeople in Indonesia
2012 OFC Nations Cup players
2013 FIFA Confederations Cup players
2016 OFC Nations Cup players
Association football wingers
Association football forwards